Thrashers are a New World group of passerine birds related to mockingbirds and New World catbirds. Like these, they are in the family Mimidae. There are 15 species in one large and 4 monotypic genera.

These do not form a clade but are a phenetic assemblage. It is rather likely than not — though by no means robustly supported — that the sage thrasher is a basal lineage among a group also consisting of mockingbirds and Toxostoma thrashers. The Caribbean thrashers occupy varying positions in an assemblage consisting of them, the tremblers, and the New World catbirds. Here, the white-breasted thrasher appears to be quite basal though it is impossible to place it anywhere with certainty, whereas the pearly-eyed thrasher is probably quite close to the tremblers. (Hunt et al. 2001, Barber et al. 2004)

Their common name describes the behaviour of these birds when searching for food on the ground: they use their long bills to "thrash" through dirt or dead leaves. All of these birds eat insects and several species also eat berries.

Taxonomic list

References
 Barber, Brian R.; Martínez-Gómez, Juan E. & Peterson, A. Townsend (2004): Systematic position of the Socorro mockingbird Mimodes graysoni. J. Avian Biol. 35: 195–198.  (HTML abstract)
 Hunt, Jeffrey S.; Bermingham, Eldredge; & Ricklefs, Robert E. (2001): Molecular systematics and biogeography of Antillean thrashers, tremblers, and mockingbirds (Aves: Mimidae). Auk 118(1): 35–55. DOI:10.1642/0004-8038(2001)118[0035:MSABOA]2.0.CO;2 HTML fulltext without images

External links
Thrasher videos on the Internet Bird Collection

Mimidae
 

Bird common names